D'Juan Marques Hines (born September 13, 1994) is an American football linebacker for the New Jersey Generals of the United States Football League (USFL). He played college football at Houston.

High school
Hines played quarterback at Dekaney High School, starting his junior and senior year. During his senior season, Hines accumulated 1,269 passing yards and 12 touchdowns while running for 388 yards and six touchdowns and was number 23 quarterback recruit in the nation by ESPN. Hines committed to the University of Houston as an athlete.

College career
After redshirting his freshman season, during which time he played wide receiver, Hines played four seasons with the Cougars. He saw action on special teams and as a reserve player at safety until moving to linebacker and becoming a starter during the 2016 season. His senior season, Hines led the team with 110 tackles, which was third in the AAC, and three forced fumbles and was named to the 1st Team All-AAC. In total, Hines had 171 tackles, eight tackles for loss, three forced fumbles, three passes defensed and an interception in four seasons. Hines was also a four-time Academic All-America selection during his time with the Cougars.

Professional career

Los Angeles Chargers
Hines was signed by Los Angeles Chargers as an undrafted free agent on May 11, 2018. He was subsequently waived by the Chargers on September 1, 2018 and signed to their practice squad the following day.

Cleveland Browns
Hines was signed off the Chargers' practice squad by the Cleveland Browns to their active roster on September 22. He made his NFL debut on September 30, 2018  against the Oakland Raiders. During his rookie season Hines played in 13 games, appearing exclusively on special teams, and made four tackles. He was waived on May 3, 2019.

Kansas City Chiefs
On June 14, 2019, Hines signed with the Kansas City Chiefs. Hines was waived by the Chiefs during final roster cuts on August 31, 2019.

New York Guardians
Hines was selected by the New York Guardians in round 6 of phase 3 of the 2020 XFL Draft. He had his contract terminated when the league suspended operations on April 10, 2020.

Hines had a tryout with the Green Bay Packers on August 17, 2020.

Ottawa Redblacks
Hines was signed by the Ottawa Redblacks of the Canadian Football League on January 18, 2021.

References

External links
Browns bio
Houston Cougars bio

1994 births
Living people
American football linebackers
Cleveland Browns players
Houston Cougars football players
Kansas City Chiefs players
Los Angeles Chargers players
New York Guardians players
Ottawa Redblacks players
People from Spring, Texas
Players of American football from Houston
Players of Canadian football from Houston
New Jersey Generals (2022) players